Endstand was a hardcore punk band from Finland. Since they formed in 1996 they have released six full-length albums, a couple EPs and many splits. They performed at numerous hardcore events, including Fluff Fest in the Czech Republic in 2001, 2004, and 2006. Endstand announced their dissolution on January 30, 2008.

Members

Final line-up 
 Janne Tamminen: Vocals
 Joel Sipilä: Bass
 Mika Kaukonen: Guitar
 Pekka Hänninen: Drums

Former members 
 Jani Koskinen: Guitar (2002–2003)
 Jani: Drums (1996–2000)
 Juho Angervuori: Guitar (2003–2006)
 Henrik "Henkka" Furu: Drums (2000–2005)
 Tapio Vartiainen: Guitar (2006–2007)

Discography

Albums 
 Endstand, MCD (Impression Recordings, 1998) 
 Endstand / Aurinkokerho split, MCD (Halla, 1999) 
 To Whom It May Concern..., CD (Impression Recordings, 1999)
 Fire Inside, CD/10" (Combat Rock Industry, 2001)
 Endstand / Bora split, cassette (Battery Cage / Fire Inside, 2002)
 Endstand / Kafka split, MCD (No! Records / Fuxony, 2002)
 Never Fall Into Silence, LP/CD (Day After, 2002)
 Hit And Run, MCD/12" (Combat Rock Industry, 2003)
 Burning Bridges, LP/CD (Day After, 2004)
 The Time Is Now, LP/CD (Lifeforce Records/Combat Rock Industry, 2006)
 Spark, LP/CD (Combat Rock Industry, 2007)

7"Inch 
 Tolerance, 7" (Rising Justice Records, 1997)
 Endstand / Outlast split, 7" (Grey Days/Bridge records, 1997)
 Picture Disc, 7" (Combat Rock Industry, 2000)

External links 
 Endstand
 Combat Rock Industry
 Combat Rock Shop

Finnish musical groups